Tesca Andrew-Wasylik (born 11 August 1990) is a Canadian female volleyball player. She is a member of Canada women's national volleyball team. She was part of the Canadian national team at the 2014 FIVB Volleyball Women's World Championship in Italy, as well as at the 2015 FIVB World Grand Prix in the United States of America.

References

1990 births
Living people
Place of birth missing (living people)
Volleyball players at the 2015 Pan American Games
Pan American Games competitors for Canada
Canadian women's volleyball players
Middle blockers
Outside hitters
Liberos
Wilfrid Laurier Golden Hawks players
Winnipeg Wesmen players